This is an order of battle listing the Allied and Japanese forces involved in the Battle of Arawe from 15 December 1943 to 24 February 1944.

Allies

Ground forces
Director Task Force
112th Cavalry Regimental Combat Team
112th Cavalry Regiment
148th Field Artillery Battalion (12 x 105mm M2A1 howitzers)
59th Engineer Company (Combat)
236th Antiaircraft Artillery Battalion (Searchlight) less elements
two batteries of the 470th Antiaircraft Artillery Battalion (Automatic Weapons)
A Company, 1st Amphibious Tractor Battalion USMC
detachment, 26th Quartermaster War Dog Platoon.
B Company, 1st Tank Battalion USMC (arrived 12 January)
Engineer, medical, ordnance and other support units
2nd Battalion, 158th Infantry Regiment (force reserve)
G Company (arrived about 18 December)
F Company (arrived about 10 January)

Naval forces
Task Force 74.1 (covering force)
Rear Admiral Victor Crutchley
Cruisers
 (flagship)

Destroyers 

Task Force 76
Destroyers
 (flagship)

Transport group

two patrol craft
two submarine chasers
Service group
three LSTs
three tug boats

Elements, Boat Battalion, 592nd Engineer Boat and Short Regiment, 2nd Engineer Special Brigade (17 x LCVP, 9 x LCM, 2 rocket-firing DUKWs, 1 x repair and salvage boat)
Beach Party Number 1

Japan

Ground forces
Merkus Garrison (withdrew after the Allied landing)
Two provisional companies drawn from the 51st Division.
Komori Force
1st Battalion, 81st Infantry Regiment (headquarters, two rifle companies, one machine gun platoon only, arrived 25 December)
Company, 54th Infantry Regiment
Engineers
1st Battalion, 141st Infantry Regiment (arrived 29 December)
Detachments from other units were also assigned to the Arawe area

Naval forces
 Southeast Area Fleet / 25th Air Flotilla (sub-unit of 11th Air Fleet)
 201 Air Group (Lakunai Airfield, Rabaul)
 204 Air Group (Lakunai)
 253 Air Group (Tobera Airfield, Rabaul)
 2nd Air Flotilla (sub-unit of 1st Air Fleet)
 Hiyō fighter group (Kavieng/Lakunai)
 Ryūhō fighter group (Kavieng/Lakunai)
 Jun'yō fighter group (Lakunai)

Notes

References

  

  

 
  

World War II orders of battle
South West Pacific theatre of World War II